MZ	Wallace is an American brand founded in Soho, New York City in 2000 by Monica Zwirner and Lucy Wallace Eustice. According to Entrepreneur, "the brand today is synonymous with functional luxury." According to People, "MZ Wallace is well-known for its sleek backpacks, crossbodies, and wallets".

History
Founders Monica Zwirner and Lucy Wallace Eustice met at a Manolo Blahnik store in 1985, and again at a farmer's market in New York in 1999. They bonded over a shared a background in the fashion industry. "They had both been circling a similar idea -- a chic, durable, all-purpose bag" which combined the functionality of nylon with the fashion sensibilities of Italian leather.

Zwirner had experience in fashion with Gucci, BMW, and Lancôme and in interior design with Selldorf Architects before co-founding MZ Wallace. Wallace Eustice worked with Harper’s Bazaar, Elle Magazine, Manolo Blahnik and Patrick Cox prior to co-founding MZ Wallace.

They founded a storefront in 2000 in Manhattan and distribute to various retailers. There is also a Chicago MZ Wallace store. They work with retailers such as Bloomingdales, Saks Fifth Avenue, Nordstrom, and Neiman Marcus.

MZ Wallace launched online in 2004. They have been noted for not discounting online sales in order to maintain the retail value of their products.

References

External links
 

Fashion accessory brands
Luxury brands
American brands
Design companies established in 2000
American companies established in 2000